Kang Ji-Yong (born 23 November 1989) is a South Korean footballer who plays as defender for Incheon United in K League Classic. He changed his name from Kang Dae-Ho to Kang Ji-Yong.

Career
He was selected by Pohang Steelers in the 2009 K League draft.

References

External links 

1989 births
Living people
Association football defenders
South Korean footballers
Pohang Steelers players
Busan IPark players
Gyeongju Citizen FC players
Bucheon FC 1995 players
Gangwon FC players
Incheon United FC players
K League 1 players
K League 2 players